The 11th Pan American Games were held in Havana, Cuba from August 2 to August 18, 1991.

Medals

Silver

Men's High Jump: Troy Kemp

Bronze

Men's Triple Jump: Wendell Lawrence

Results by event

See also
Bahamas at the 1990 Central American and Caribbean Games
Bahamas at the 1992 Summer Olympics

Nations at the 1991 Pan American Games
1991
Pan American Games